Anders Olsen Haugen (October 24, 1888 – April 14, 1984) was a Norwegian-American ski jumper who won four national ski jumping championships. He competed in the 1924 Winter Olympics in Chamonix and the 1928 Winter Olympics in St. Moritz. Anders Haugen was the first and, as of 2022, only American to win an Olympic medal for ski jumping.

Biography
Anders Olsen Haugen was born in Bø, Telemark, Norway. Anders Haugen and his brother Lars emigrated to the United States in 1909 and built a ski jumping hill with the Milwaukee Ski Club near Lake Nagawicka west of Milwaukee, Wisconsin, in order to open ski jumping to the public of the area.

In 1911 Anders Haugen set a world record of 46m (152 feet) on Curry Hill in Ironwood, Michigan while winning the National Championship. Between 1910 and 1920, the Haugen brothers won the U.S. National Championships eleven times. In 1919 and 1920, Anders Haugen set the two world record ski jumping distances of 213 ft (64.92m) and 214 ft (65.23m), respectively.

He was Captain of the first US skiing team at the 1924 Winter Olympics.

Haugen and his brothers later moved to northwestern Wisconsin and then Frisco, Colorado.

Haugen had won the 1924 Olympic ski jumping bronze medal in the individual large hill, though he was not awarded the medal due to a scoring error. In 1974, at the 50th reunion of the 1924 Norwegian team, Norwegian sports historian Jacob Vaage was going over the results when he noticed an error. The bronze medal had been awarded to Norwegian skier Thorleif Haug, who also won three gold medals in the first Winter Olympics in Chamonix. On 12 September 1974, Anders Haugen came to Norway as an 86-year-old and was given the bronze medal by Anna Maria Magnussen, Thorleif  Haug's youngest daughter.

In 1929, Haugen and his brother Lars moved to the Lake Tahoe area in California, where he developed the Lake Tahoe Ski Club. Up until his 70s, he directed the junior skiing program at the ski club. Haugen was elected to the Colorado Ski and Snowboard Hall of Fame in 1978.

Haugen was inducted into the U.S. Ski Hall of Fame in 1963. His bronze medal is on display at the Hall of Fame in Ishpeming, Michigan.

He died at Redlands Community Hospital in San Bernardino, California on April 14, 1984, of kidney failure, and had been suffering from prostate cancer.

Personal life

Haugen became a strict vegetarian in 1911 and adhered to the diet for the rest of his life.  He stated that his vegetarian diet gave him more strength and improved his skiing performance. He was a teetotaller and non-smoker. He married Mina Amundson in 1917, they had two sons.

Cross-country skiing results

Olympic Games

Ski jumping world records

 Not recognized! Crash at world record distance.

References

External links

1888 births
1984 deaths
Deaths from prostate cancer
Deaths from kidney failure
People from Bø, Telemark
Norwegian emigrants to the United States
American male ski jumpers
American male cross-country skiers
American male Nordic combined skiers
Norwegian male ski jumpers
Norwegian male cross-country skiers
Olympic ski jumpers of the United States
Olympic cross-country skiers of the United States
Olympic Nordic combined skiers of the United States
Cross-country skiers at the 1924 Winter Olympics
Nordic combined skiers at the 1924 Winter Olympics
Ski jumpers at the 1924 Winter Olympics
Cross-country skiers at the 1928 Winter Olympics
Nordic combined skiers at the 1928 Winter Olympics
Ski jumpers at the 1928 Winter Olympics
Olympic bronze medalists for the United States
Olympic medalists in ski jumping
Medalists at the 1924 Winter Olympics
Sportspeople from Vestfold og Telemark